ArrivaClick is a demand responsive transport service operated by Arriva UK Bus. Passengers book and pay for journeys via a smartphone app, which then matches passengers traveling between similar points, calculating an ad hoc route to the destinations required.

History
ArrivaClick was launched in March 2017 in Sittingbourne, with Liverpool becoming the first city to be served by ArrivaClick in 2018.

Operations

Speke
Arriva North West currently operate the ArrivaClick service around the Speke area

Watford
Arriva Click currently operates within Watford and the surrounding area

Ebbsfleet

ArrivaClick services currently operate within the Ebbsfleet area

Former Operations

Sittingbourne
ArrivaClick in Sittingbourne was operated by Arriva Southern Counties, During November 2019 Arriva replaced the service with a fixed-route service in part of the area.

Liverpool
ArrivaClick began operations in Liverpool city centre and the southern areas of the city during December 2018. however in July 2020, Arriva announced that it would not be returning its operations to Liverpool after suspending services in March due to the COVID-19 pandemic

Leicestershire
Arriva Midlands commenced operating ArrivaClick services in partnership with developers of the New Lubbesthorpe housing estate in Leicestershire in April 2019. The Leicestershire operations were scaled back in October 2021 to operate during daytimes only  

Arriva Click operations in Leicester ceased on 31 July 2022 with Vectare East Midlands operating a replacement service Novus Direct and Novus Flex from 1st August.

Fleet
ArrivaClick services are operated by Mercedes-Benz Sprinter minibuses. As of December 2018, it has a total of 30 vehicles.

References

ArrivaClick
Transport in Leicester
Transport in Leicestershire
Transport in Liverpool
Bus operators in Merseyside
Transport in Kent
Demand responsive transport in the United Kingdom